In the mathematical field of knot theory, the crosscap number of a knot K is the minimum of 

taken over all compact, connected, non-orientable surfaces S bounding K; here  is the Euler characteristic.  The crosscap number of the unknot is zero, as the Euler characteristic of the disk is one.

Knot sum
The crosscap number of a knot sum is bounded:

Examples
 The crosscap number of the trefoil knot is 1, as it bounds a Möbius strip and is not trivial.
 The crosscap number of a torus knot was determined by M. Teragaito.

Further reading
 Clark, B.E. "Crosscaps and Knots", Int. J. Math and Math. Sci, Vol 1, 1978, pp 113–124
 Murakami, Hitoshi and Yasuhara, Akira. "Crosscap number of a knot," Pacific J. Math. 171 (1995), no. 1, 261–273.
 Teragaito, Masakazu. "Crosscap numbers of torus knots," Topology Appl. 138 (2004), no. 1–3, 219–238.
 Teragaito, Masakazu and Hirasawa, Mikami. "Crosscap numbers of 2-bridge knots," Arxiv:math.GT/0504446.
 J.Uhing. "Zur Kreuzhaubenzahl von Knoten", diploma thesis, 1997, University of Dortmund, (German language)

External links
"Crosscap Number", KnotInfo.

Knot invariants